Fountain Alley is a pedestrian paseo in Downtown San Jose.

History

Fountain Alley's origins lie in the 19th century as a thin but prominent alley made up of mews and a horse trough, which gave it its name.

The Bank of Italy Building, San Jose's oldest skyscraper, was built on the alley in 1925.

Fountain Alley lost its urban importance in the late 20th century, when it became notable as a crime hotspot. Since the 2010s, the alley has been the site of an ongoing revitalization program, which has ended the area's crime streak and introduced public events, like tailgates and pop-ups.

Location

Fountain Alley is located in central Downtown San Jose. It spans between 1st Street and 2nd Street.

The Santa Clara Street station on the VTA light rail is located on either side of Fountain Alley.

It is within walking distance of the future Downtown San José station of Bay Area Rapid Transit (BART).

See also
Paseo de San Antonio
Bank of Italy Building

References

External links

Fountain Alley
Pedestrian malls in the United States
Downtown San Jose